Giulio Cesare Corradi (Parma, c.1650 - Venice, 1701 or 1702) was an Italian opera librettist.

No biographical information exists prior to 1674 and the appearance of his first work.

Libretti
La schiava fortunata (1674), set by Ziani
La divisione del mondo (1675), set by Legrenzi at the Teatro San Salvador.
Germanico sul Reno (1676),  set by Legrenzi
Creso (1681),  set by Legrenzi
I due Cesari (1683),  set by Legrenzi
Il gran Tamerlano (1689),  set by Ziani - reworked by Christian Heinrich Postel for Johann Philipp Förtsch at the Oper am Gänsemarkt 1690.
Domizio (1696),  set by Ziani
Primislao primo re di Boemia (1697),  set by Albinoni
Tigrane re d'Armenia (1697),  set by Albinoni
Egisto re di Cipro (1698),  set by Ziani
La pastorella al soglio (opera postuma Oct. 1702) set by various composers, at Teatro San Cassiano

References

1701 deaths
Italian opera librettists
17th-century Italian poets
17th-century Italian male writers
Italian male poets
Year of birth uncertain
Writers from Parma
Italian male dramatists and playwrights
17th-century Italian dramatists and playwrights